FC Goa Reserves and Academy is the reserve side and youth academy system of Indian Super League side FC Goa. Based in Goa, the reserve side participated in the I-League 2nd Division, the second division of Indian football, and currently in Goa Professional League. The youth teams, which are under 18, under 15 and under 13 squads, participate in various divisions of Elite League.

History
On 20 February 2018, it was announced by the All India Football Federation, the organizing body for Indian football, that the FC Goa, along with six other Indian Super League sides, would field a reserve team in the I-League 2nd Division, India's second division football league. In November 2020, FC Goa tied up with German football club RB Leipzig, to focus on youth development and coach training on a three-year strategic partnership. As part of the deal, coaches from RB Leipzig's Academy will conduct workshops in Goa.

On 8 January 2021, Deggie Cardozo was appointed as the Head coach of FC Goa Reserves.

Squad

Current technical staff

Statistics and records

Season-by-season

Head coaches record

See also

 FC Goa

References

External links

 

FC Goa Reserves and Academy
Football clubs in Goa
Indian reserve football teams
Association football clubs established in 2018
I-League 2nd Division clubs
2018 establishments in Goa
Football academies in India